Robert Henry Tufrey Smith  (born May 22, 1935) is an Australian-Canadian academic who was the president pro tempore of the University of British Columbia in 1985. A professor of geography, Smith was educated at Australian National University, the University of New England and Northwestern University. In 1964, he was a Guggenheim Fellow. He is a fellow of the Academy of the Social Sciences in Australia and a member of the Order of Australia.

References

1935 births
Living people
Presidents of the University of British Columbia
Economic geographers
Fellows of the Academy of the Social Sciences in Australia
Members of the Order of Australia